The 1995–96 Texas Tech Red Raiders men's basketball team represented Texas Tech University in the Southwest Conference during the 1995–96 NCAA Division I men's basketball season. This was Texas Tech's final year in the conference before becoming a charter member of the Big 12 Conference. The head coach was James Dickey, his 5th year with the team. The Red Raiders played their home games in the Lubbock Municipal Coliseum in Lubbock, Texas.

Roster

Schedule and results

|-
!colspan=9 style=| Non-conference Regular season

|-
!colspan=9 style=| SWC Regular season

|-
!colspan=9 style=| SWC Tournament

|-
!colspan=9 style=| NCAA Tournament

Rankings

NCAA violations

The NCAA Committee on Infractions found violations involving nine sports dating back to 1990 and included NCAA rules infractions in the areas of eligibility, extra benefits, recruiting, unethical conduct, failure to monitor and lack of institutional control. For the next four years, Texas Tech was placed on probation and the 1996–97 men's basketball team was ineligible for conference wins and participation in the 1997 NCAA Division I men's basketball tournament.

References

Texas Tech Red Raiders basketball seasons
Texas Tech
Texas Tech
Texas Tech
Texas Tech